Chronology is a 2014 puzzle-platform game by Danish developer Bedtime Digital Media, where the player defies time by manipulating the past and the future, in order to fix the present. As the Old Inventor and his sidekick The Snail, player can take advantage of their special abilities - travel back and forth in time, stop time, manipulate objects and solve puzzles.

The game released on May 12, 2014 for Microsoft Windows and September 12, 2014 for iOS.

References

2014 video games
IOS games
Platform games
Puzzle video games
Single-player video games
Video games about time travel
Video games developed in Denmark
Windows games